Chester Allan Read (19 February 1929 – 14 April 2001) was an Australian rules footballer who played with South Melbourne and St Kilda in the Victorian Football League (VFL).

Notes

External links 

1929 births
Australian rules footballers from Victoria (Australia)
Sydney Swans players
St Kilda Football Club players
2001 deaths